Yury Stepanovich Nechaev-Maltsov (1834–1913) was a leading glassware manufacturer, Landlord, patron of the arts, and the major private donor to the Pushkin Museum. He owned a number of shops in Moscow and St. Petersburg where the glassware produced by his factories in Gus-Khrustalny was sold. Russia's biggest fairs were supplied with his glass products.

See also 
Pushkin Museum
Polibino, Lipetsk Oblast
Stepan Nechayev

External links

1834 births
1913 deaths
Philanthropists from the Russian Empire
Russian stained glass artists and manufacturers
Russian landlords
19th-century landowners
19th-century philanthropists
Privy Councillor (Russian Empire)
Russian landowners
19th-century businesspeople from the Russian Empire